Elachista argillacea is a moth of the family Elachistidae. It is found in California, United States.

The length of the forewings is 3.7–4.8 mm. The basal third of the forewing costa is gray, the wing is otherwise entirely white. The hindwings are light gray and the underside of the forewings is brownish gray. The costal margin of the hindwings is brownish gray, but otherwise grayish white.

Etymology
The species name is derived from Latin argilla (meaning white clay).

References

Moths described in 1997
argillacea
Moths of North America